The Kat River is a tributary of the Great Fish River, that drains the southern slopes of the Winterberg in the Eastern Cape Province, South Africa.

Etymology
Kat, meaning "cat", is a translation of the Khoekhoen word "huncu", that apparently referred to the wildcats of the area. It lent its name to Katberg, the Katberg Pass and the Kat River Settlement.

Course and utilization
At  it forms a northern tributary of the Great Fish River, northeast of Fort Brown and south of Hamburg, Eastern Cape.

It supplies the Kat River Valley with irrigation water for large citrus orchards, and supplies Seymour and Fort Beaufort with domestic water.

Dams
 Katrivier Dam

See also
 List of rivers in South Africa

References 

Rivers of the Eastern Cape